Jacqui Zelenka (born 26 May 1992) is an Australian professional basketball player. She previously played for the Townsville Fire in the WNBL.

Career

College
From 2010–2014, Zelenka played for the Southwest Baptist Bearcats located in Bolivar, Missouri where she lived. Participating in the NCAA's Division II and primarily in the Mid-America Intercollegiate Athletics Association (MIAA).

WNBL
After a successful college career in the United States, Zelenka returned home to Queensland and began her professional career with the Townsville Fire. She has since won two WNBL Championships, led by Suzy Batkovic and Cayla George. She has been re-signed for the 2016–17 season.

References

1992 births
Living people
Forwards (basketball)
Australian women's basketball players
People from Bolivar, Missouri